Paramegadenus is a genus of parasitic sea snails, marine gastropod mollusks in the family Eulimidae.

Distribution
This marine genus is endemic to Australia and occurs off Queensland

Species
 Paramegadenus arrhynchus (Ivanov, 1937)
 Paramegadenus incerta Warén, 1980
 Paramegadenus scutellicola Warén, 1980

References

 Humphreys & Lutzen, 1972 (Biologiske Skrifter, 19(1): 25)
 Warén A. (1980) Descriptions of new taxa of Eulimidae (Mollusca, Prosobranchia), with notes on some previously described genera. Zoologica Scripta 9: 283-306

External links
 To World Register of Marine Species

Eulimidae
Gastropods of Australia